Heherson "Sonny" Turingan Alvarez (October 26, 1939 – April 20, 2020) was a politician from the Philippines. He served as a member of the House of Representatives of the Philippines and the Senate of the Philippines. He was also Minister (then Secretary) of Agrarian Reform from 1986 to 1987 and Secretary of Environment and Natural Resources from 2001 to 2002.

He was a young activist who participated in the 1971 constitutional convention. He refused to sign the Ferdinand Marcos regime backed constitution that gave extensions to the president's term in office. He fled with his family to the US leaving the  Philippines behind as martial law took its toll on opposition activists.

While in exile, he was one of the organizers of the Free Philippines movement that supported his friend and opposition leader, Senator Benigno "Ninoy" Aquino Jr. After Aquino was assassinated, the Philippine leadership changed as Corazon Aquino, the wife of Benigno Aquino Jr., took power after the successful "People Power Revolution". He returned to the Philippines in 1986 to partake in rebuilding the government in the wake of collapse of the Marcos regime. He won a senatorial seat, representing Isabela province's 4th district, in the post-revolution government of President Corazon Aquino. He served two terms 1987 to 1998 and 1998–2001.

Senator Alvarez also held two cabinet positions - Secretary of Agrarian Reform (February 7, 1987 – March 7, 1987) and Secretary of Environment and Natural Resources (March 29, 2001 – December 13, 2002). He was known as staunch environmentalist as he was called "Mr. Environment" during his term as Environmental Secretary. Moreover, as a senator, he authored the resolution to make April 22 of every year as "Earth Day" in the Philippines.

From 2010 to 2016, he served as commissioner and vice chair of the Climate Change Commission.

Education

Sonny Alvarez studied liberal arts at the University of the Philippines. He also earned a master's degree in Economics and Public Administration from Harvard University.

Personal life
Alvarez married, artist and activist, Cecile Guidote; the couple had two children, Hexilon and Herxilla.

Death
Senator Alvarez and wife, Cecile contracted the COVID-19 during the COVID-19 pandemic in the Philippines sometime in March. They were both hospitalized. CNN reported that Heherson Alvarez underwent experimental plasma therapy treatment and blood plasma convalescent therapy. On April 20, 2020, Alvarez died in Manila due to complications from COVID-19.

References

1939 births
2020 deaths
Filipino environmentalists
Laban ng Demokratikong Pilipino politicians
Senators of the 10th Congress of the Philippines
Senators of the 9th Congress of the Philippines
Senators of the 8th Congress of the Philippines
Members of the House of Representatives of the Philippines from Isabela (province)
People from Santiago, Isabela
Secretaries of Agrarian Reform of the Philippines
Secretaries of Environment and Natural Resources of the Philippines
Harvard Kennedy School alumni
Filipino expatriates in the United States
Corazon Aquino administration cabinet members
Arroyo administration personnel
University of the Philippines alumni
Deaths from the COVID-19 pandemic in the Philippines